Huangteng Gorge, also known as "little Jiuzhaigou", is located in Qingyuan Huangtengxia Eco-tourist Scenic Spots, Guangdong, China, with a height of  above sea level.

Tourism
The Huangtengxia Drifting, is a suitable for the exploration of leisure activities located in Huangteng Gorge.

Image gallery

References

External links

Mountains of Guangdong
Tourist attractions in Qingyuan